Kishi Shabakty (Maloye Chebachye —"Small Chebachye") is a lake in Burabay District, Akmola Region, Kazakhstan.

The lake is part of the Burabay National Park, a protected area.

Geography
Kishi Shabakty lies in the eastern sector of the Kokshetau Lakes, at the northwestern edge of the Kokshetau Massif. The water of the lake is slightly saline.

A mountain range rises above the southeastern shores of Kishi Shabakty.

Flora and fauna 
Among the fish species living in the lake the native species are crucian carp, Prussian carp, perch, pike and roach. Bream, zander, ripus, peled and muksun have been introduced.

See also
List of lakes of Kazakhstan

References

External links
Burabay National Park (in Russian)

Lakes of Kazakhstan
North Kazakhstan Region
Kazakh Uplands